Hamlet is an unincorporated community in Faulkner County, Arkansas, United States. The community is located at the junction of U.S. Route 64 and Arkansas Highway 36, about halfway between Conway and Vilonia along the former.

The Liberty School Cafeteria, which is listed on the National Register of Historic Places, is near the community.

References

Unincorporated communities in Faulkner County, Arkansas
Unincorporated communities in Arkansas